Extension Reef is a reef which encompasses a large number of small islands and rocks, extending  southwest from the south end of Rabot Island, in the Biscoe Islands. It was first charted and named by the British Graham Land Expedition, 1934–37, under John Rymill.

References 

Reefs of Graham Land
Landforms of the Biscoe Islands